Andre Dubus III (born September 11, 1959) is an American novelist and short story writer. He is a member of the faculty at the University of Massachusetts Lowell.

Early life and education
Born in Oceanside, California, to Patricia (née Lowe) and Louisiana-born writer Andre Dubus, Dubus grew up in mill towns in the Merrimack River valley along the Massachusetts-New Hampshire border with his three siblings: Suzanne, Jeb, and Nicole.

He began writing fiction at age 22, a few months after graduating from the University of Texas at Austin with a bachelor's degree in sociology. To support himself, Dubus worked as a carpenter, bartender, office cleaner, personal investigator, corrections counselor, and halfway house counselor.

Career 
His first published short story, "Forky," was published by Playboy when Dubus was 23.

Dubus's novel, House of Sand and Fog (1999), was a finalist for the National Book Award and was adapted for an Academy Award-nominated film of the same name. The book was a No. 1 New York Times bestseller.

His 2011 memoir Townie tells of growing up poor in Haverhill after his parents' divorce, street fighting, and eventually boxing, and deals extensively with his relationship with his father.

The novel Gone So Long was published in 2018. Daniel Ahearn committed a violent act that changed the lives of many, including members of his own family. Forty years older and sick, he aims to set things right. He is especially set on visiting his estranged daughter, whom he has not seen in decades.

His novel Such Kindness was scheduled to be published in June of 2023, to be followed by a collection of personal essays titled Ghost Dogs, which will be published in 2024.

Affiliations
A member of PEN American Center, Dubus has served as a panelist for the National Book Foundation and the National Endowment for the Arts.

He has taught writing at Harvard University, Tufts University, Emerson College, and the University of Massachusetts Lowell, where he is a full-time faculty member.

In November 2018 Oprah Winfrey was a guest at UMass Lowell, which is considered the results of an over three-year effort made by Dubus. He met Winfrey in 2000 when appearing on her show, after the release of his novel House of Sand and Fog.

Honors

Dubus's work has been included in The Best American Essays 1994, The Best Spiritual Writing 1999, and The Best of Hope Magazine. He has been awarded a Guggenheim Fellowship, the National Magazine Award for fiction, and  the Pushcart Prize. He was a finalist for the Rome Prize awarded by the American Academy of Arts and Letters.

Dubus's novel House of Sand and Fog was a fiction finalist for the National Book Award, the Los Angeles Times Book Prize, and Booksense Book of the Year. It was an Oprah Book Club selection and was on the New York Times bestseller list. The 2003 film adaptation directed by Vadim Perelman was nominated for three Oscars, a Golden Globe and 39 other prizes. It won 13 nominations.

Townie was No. 4 on the New York Times bestseller list and included in the Editors Choice section.

Dirty Love was also included in the Editors Choice section of the New York Times. For the 2013 audio book, read by Dubus, he won the AudioFile Earphone Award.

Dubus’s work has been translated and published in more than twenty-five different languages.

Works

Novels 
 Bluesman (1993)
 House of Sand and Fog (W. W. Norton, 1999)
 The Garden of Last Days (W. W. Norton, 2008)
 Dirty Love (W. W. Norton, 2013)
 Gone So Long (W. W. Norton, 2018) 
 Such Kindness (W. W.  Norton, 2023)

Short story collections 

 The Cage Keeper and Other Stories (1989). Contains 7 short stories:
 "The Cage Keeper"
 "Duckling Girl"
 "Wolves in the Marsh"
 "Forky"
 "Mountains"
 "White Trees, Hammer Moon"
 "Last Dance"

Non-fiction
 Townie: A Memoir (W. W. Norton, 2011)
 Ghost Dogs (a book of personal essays forthcoming in 2024)

Anthologies
 "Blood, Root, Knit, Purl." Knitting Yarns: Writers on Knitting edited by Ann Hood (W. W. Norton, 2013)

Personal life
Dubus is married to performer Fontaine Dollas. They reside in Newbury, Massachusetts, with their three children.

References

External links

 The Official Website of Andre Dubus III
 Bostonist interviews Andre Dubus III about his novel The Garden of Last Days
 Video: 
 Video:  (taped May 31, 2008/Los Angeles Convention Center)
 2003 Interview on NPR's Fresh Air
2013 Interview on The Lit Show

1959 births
Living people
20th-century American novelists
Novelists from Massachusetts
People from Newbury, Massachusetts
University of Massachusetts Lowell faculty
21st-century American novelists
American male novelists
American male short story writers
20th-century American short story writers
21st-century American short story writers
20th-century American male writers
21st-century American male writers
University of Texas alumni